Attanagalla Divisional Secretariat is a  Divisional Secretariat  of Gampaha District, of Western Province, Sri Lanka.The duties possessed by " Rate  Mahattaya " have been entrusted with Divisional Revenues Officers in 1950 In forming Divisional Assistant Government Agent  Attanagalla has become a Divisional Secretariat in 1972 which covers Attanagalla Electorate.

Administrative units
Attanagalla Divisional Secretariat which had possessed 86 Gama Niladhari  Divisional at the beginning is now consisted of 151 Grama Niladhari Divisions(GN Divisions) which is the highest number of GN divisions located in a Divisional secretariat in Sri Lanka for the time being.

Population

References

External links
Attanagalla Divisional Secrertarat
 Divisional Secretariats Portal

Divisional Secretariats of Gampaha District